Colleen Celeste Camp (born June 7, 1953) is an American character actress and producer. After appearing in several bit parts, she had a lead role in the comedy The Swinging Cheerleaders (1974), followed by roles in two installments of the Police Academy series. Camp had supporting roles in Death Game (1977), Apocalypse Now (1979), and The Seduction (1982), after which she played Julie’s mother in Valley Girl and Yvette the Maid in the 1985 comedy Clue.

Camp has continued to have minor and supporting roles in various independent and studio films, including Die Hard with a Vengeance (1995), Election (1999), Factory Girl (2006), Palo Alto (2013), American Hustle (2013), and The House with a Clock in Its Walls (2018).

Early life
Colleen Camp was born in San Francisco, California. She has two brothers, Don and Glen. She moved to the San Fernando Valley at a young age and attended John H. Francis Polytechnic High School, Los Angeles Valley College, and California State University, Northridge, where she majored in English and minored in theater arts.

Career
To help pay for college, Camp trained macaws  at Busch Gardens on weeknights, weekends, and then during summers performing for crowds of up to 2,000 in six shows a day, six days a week. Aspiring to be an actress, Camp took private acting and singing lessons. She was noticed by a talent agent for her hour-long Busch Gardens television special featuring her and her birds, and hired for national-television commercials for Gallo wine and Touch of Sweden hand lotion. This exposure led to small television parts in shows such as Marcus Welby, M.D., Happy Days, and Love, American Style, as well as a six-episode stint on the miniseries Rich Man, Poor Man.

Camp landed small early roles in films like Funny Lady with Barbra Streisand and James Caan, and Smile with Bruce Dern and Barbara Feldon in 1975. She also appeared in the Bruce Lee movie Game of Death (1978) as his girlfriend, Ann, the young aspiring singer (her scenes were shot with a lookalike as Lee had died before she became involved) performing the film's love theme "Will This Be The Song I'll Be Singing Tomorrow". Camp went on to portray a Playmate in Francis Coppola's 1979 film Apocalypse Now (followed by an actual pictorial in the October 1979 Playboy), though most of her footage was cut from the initial theatrical release. She would later feature more prominently in Coppola's Redux cut. She was also the first actress to play Kristin Shepard, the sister of Linda Gray's character, in the primetime soap opera Dallas in 1979. Mary Crosby later replaced Camp in this role.

Camp worked steadily in film comedies like Peter Bogdanovich's 1981 comedy They All Laughed, 1983's Valley Girl, 1985's Clue, and the 1994 Michael J. Fox comedy Greedy. She played a police officer in two of the Police Academy films and in Die Hard with a Vengeance. Camp was nominated twice for the Worst Supporting Actress Golden Raspberry Award – first, in 1982, for The Seduction, and then, in 1993, for Sliver. In 1999, she had a small part as character Tracy Flick's overbearing mother in the film Election, with Reese Witherspoon as Tracy. She appeared in the episode "Simple Explanation" of House in 2009.

In 2013, she appeared in a supporting role in David O. Russell's American Hustle The following year, Camp co-produced a Broadway production of Love Letters and in 2015 co-produced Eli Roth's thriller Knock Knock in which she also appeared in a supporting role in the film.

Personal life
In the late 1970s, Camp dated Dean Tavoularis, whom she met in the Philippines while filming Apocalypse Now. In 1986, she married John Goldwyn, a Paramount executive, though they divorced in 2001. They have one daughter, Emily.

In November 2020, Camp's engagement to 34-year-old Garrett Moore, son of photographer Derry Moore, 12th Earl of Drogheda, was announced.

Filmography

Film

Television

References

External links

 
 
 
 Colleen Camp at the American Film Institute catalog

1953 births
American film actresses
Film producers from California
American television actresses
Living people
Actresses from San Francisco
20th-century American actresses
21st-century American actresses
Goldwyn family
American women film producers